Daniel Gołębiewski (born 15 July 1987 in Wyszków) is a Polish former professional footballer. Nominally a center forward, yet can also play as a left midfielder and left back.

Club career
In June 2011, he was loaned to Górnik Zabrze on a one-year deal.

In 2019, Gołębiewski joined MLKS Żbik Nasielsk.

References

External links
 
 

1987 births
Living people
Polish footballers
Polonia Warsaw players
ŁKS Łomża players
Górnik Zabrze players
Korona Kielce players
Bytovia Bytów players
Ząbkovia Ząbki players
MKP Pogoń Siedlce players
Widzew Łódź players
Kotwica Kołobrzeg footballers
Legionovia Legionowo players
Ekstraklasa players
I liga players
II liga players
III liga players
People from Wyszków
Sportspeople from Masovian Voivodeship
Association football forwards